Michael Knost (born March 19, 1967) is the pen name of Michael Earl Collins, a suspense author, anthology editor, magazine feature writer, and writing teacher/lecturer who lives in Chapmanville, West Virginia.

He is a former Horror Writers Association's mentorship program chairperson,  Knost also teaches writing workshops and online classes.

Originally from Logan, West Virginia, Michael Knost now lives with his wife, Jewell and his daughter, Bella in Chapmanville, West Virginia.

Publication History 

Legends of the Mountain State (2007, Woodland Press), an anthology, written by storytellers across the nation, includes 13 accounts of ghostly manifestations and myths and mountain mythology, based on known legends from West Virginia. Themes included in this work are Mothman, the Ethel coalmine specter, the Chapmanville school haunting, the Ghost of #22, and many others. After the success of the first anthology, Knost went on to edit Legends of the Mountain State 2, Legends of the Mountain State 3, and Legends of the Mountain State 4, (Woodland Press 2008-2010) which received critical acclaim from Dark Scribe Magazine and Shroud Magazine.Mothman Files (2011, Woodland Press), an anthology, discusses strange occurrences and alarming sightings in and around Point Pleasant, West Virginia—the mothman. Return of the Mothman (2014, Woodland Press), is the second installment of the "Mothman" series in which Ted Browning returns to his rural town in West Virginia and is forced to face his inner demons. Michael Knost received a Bram Stoker Award nomination in the category, "Superior Achievement in First Novel" in 2014 for this anthology.Barbers and Beauties (Hummingbird House Press, co-edited with Nancy Eden Siegel,) an anthology, explores the dark possibilities of beauty told from the perspectives of four women and four men. Michael Knost and his co-editor received a Bram Stoker nomination for "Superior Achievement in Anthology" in 2013 for this flip book anthology.

Michael Knost's most critically acclaimed book thus far is Writer's Workshop of Horror (2009, Woodland Press), a non-fiction anthology that includes writing advice from the experts in the field. Knost won the Bram Stoker Award for "Superior Achievement in Non-Fiction," in 2009 and won The Black Quill Award  for "Editor's Choice of Best Dark Genre of Non-Fiction."

 Other publications 

 Appalachian Winter Hauntings (2009, Woodland Press, co-edited with Mark Justice), an anthology
 Dark Tales of Terror (2010, Woodland Press), an anthology
 Specters in Coal Dust (2010, Woodland Press), an anthology
 Fed From the Blade (2012, Woodland Press), an anthology
 Writers Workshop of Science Fiction & Fantasy (2013, Seventh Star Press), a novel
 Author's Guide to Marketing with Teeth'' (2015, Seventh Star Press), a non-fiction book

Awards and honors

References

American male novelists
1967 births
Novelists from West Virginia
21st-century American novelists
Living people
21st-century American male writers